Ubiquitin-like modifier-activating enzyme 5 is a protein that in humans is encoded by the UBA5 gene.

This gene encodes a member of the E1-like activating enzyme family. Two alternatively spliced transcript variants encoding distinct isoforms have been found for this gene.

References

Further reading

External links